George Castle may refer to:

Places 
 George Castle, in India's Madhav National Park
 George Castle, aka "John George Bastion", in the Königstein Fortress

People
 George Castle (physician) (c. 1635–1673), English physician
 George Castle (journalist), American sports journalist and author
 George Castle (lacrosse) (born 1984), American lacrosse player

Fiction 
 George Castle (Law & Order: UK), a character in the UK TV series Law & Order: UK

See also
 St George's Castle (disambiguation)
 George Castledine (died 2018), British nursing educator and nursing consultant